Evan Medell (born March 31, 1997) is a Para Taekwondo practitioner. He represented the United States at the 2020 Summer Paralympics. He won one of the bronze medals in the men's +75 kg event. He had previously won a gold medal in Taekwondo at the 2019 Parapan American Games.

References

American male taekwondo practitioners
Paralympic taekwondo practitioners of the United States
1997 births
Living people
Place of birth missing (living people)
Taekwondo practitioners at the 2020 Summer Paralympics
Paralympic bronze medalists for the United States
Medalists at the 2020 Summer Paralympics
Paralympic medalists in taekwondo
People from Grand Haven, Michigan
Sportspeople from Michigan
21st-century American people